Lindsay Johnson (1914–1952) was an Australian rugby league footballer who played in the 1940s.

Originally from Newcastle, Lindsay Johnson came to Canterbury-Bankstown in 1940 and stayed at the club for seven seasons. He starred in the 1942 Grand Final by kicking the winning goal in Canterbury's 19–9 win over St George Dragons and he also played in the losing 1940 Grand Final. He kicked 144 goals during his seven seasons at the club and at one point he played 78 consecutive games. Lin Johnson also represented New South Wales on one occasion in 1940.

Johnson died on 26 January 1952, aged 38.

References

1914 births
1952 deaths
Canterbury-Bankstown Bulldogs players
New South Wales rugby league team players
Rugby league fullbacks